Obluchye is the name of several inhabited localities in Russia.

Urban localities
Obluchye, Jewish Autonomous Oblast, a town in Obluchensky District of the Jewish Autonomous Oblast

Rural localities
Obluchye, Novgorod Oblast, a village in Gruzinskoye Settlement of Chudovsky District in Novgorod Oblast
Obluchye, Pskov Oblast, a village in Dedovichsky District of Pskov Oblast
Obluchye, Tula Oblast, a settlement in Krasivskaya Rural Administration of Chernsky District in Tula Oblast